The 1901 Villanova Wildcats football team was an American football team that represented Villanova University as an independent during the 1901 college football season. The team compiled a 2–3 record.  A September 1901 account in The Philadelphia Inquirer identified John F. Bagley as the team's coach. However, the Villanova Football Media Guide identifies John J. Egan as the coach. Egan was also a player on the team.

Schedule

References

Villanova
Villanova Wildcats football seasons
Villanova Wildcats football